Siona (otherwise known as Bain Coca, Pioje, Pioche-Sioni, Ganteyabain, Ganteya, Ceona, Zeona, Koka, Kanú) is a Tucanoan language of Colombia and Ecuador. The language is essentially the same as Secoya, but speakers are ethnically distinct. 

As of 2013, Siona is spoken by about 550 people.
Teteté dialect (Eteteguaje) is extinct.

Phonology

Vowels
There are 6 oral vowels and six nasal vowels.

Consonants
There are two series of obstruent consonant. Both often produce a noticeable delay before the onset of the following vowel: the 'fortis' series (written p t č k kw s h hw) tends to be aspirated, with a noisy transition to the vowel, while the 'lenis' series (written b d g gw ’ z), optionally voiced, is glottalized, with a silent transition to the vowel, which in turn tends to be laryngealized. The glottal stop is faint, and noticeable primarily in the laryngealizing effect it has on adjacent vowels.

Stress
Stress is obligatory on all verb stems, root words, and some suffixes. It disappears when the syllable is not the nucleus of a phonological word. Some monosyllabic morphemes have both stressed and unstressed forms. Although the position of stress within a word is not contrastive, vocalic and consonantal allophony depends on whether a syllable is stressed. Initial stressed vowels followed by unstressed vowels are long and have a falling tone.

References

External links 
 Wheeler, Alva. 1970. Grammar of the Siona language, Colombia, South America. Ph.D. thesis. University of California. 192 p.

Siona (Intercontinental Dictionary Series)

Tucanoan languages
Indigenous languages of Western Amazonia
Languages of Colombia
Languages of Ecuador